Ashéninka (Ashéninca, Ashéninga) is the name that some varieties included in the Ashéninka-Asháninka dialect complex have traditionally received. These varieties belong to the Campan branch of the Arawak family. Ethnologue distinguishes seven languages throughout the whole complex, while Pedrós proposes a division in three languages (Ashéninka, Asháninka and Northern Ashé-Ashá) based on the principle of mutual intelligibility. The varieties included in Ashéninka and Northern Ashé-Ashá have traditionally been called Ashéninka. Glottolog reflects Pedrós’ proposal, although considering the languages proposed by him as groupings of the languages that the Ethnologue distinguishes.

According to the indigenous peoples database of the Peruvian Ministry of Education, there are 15,281 people living in Ashéninka communities, of whom 8,774 (57%) claim to be able to speak the language. Ethnologue gives much higher figures for the different Ashéninka varieties.

The classification of the different varieties was first established by David Payne in his Apurucayali Axininca grammar, but he referred to them as dialects and not as different languages.

Ashéninka is a locally official language in Peru, as are all native Peruvian languages. It and its relatives are also known by the allegedly pejorative term Campa.

Alphabet 
Ashéninka was recognized as a separate language from Asháninka 2017, and the process to fix an alphabet finished in April 2019 with its approval by the Ministry of Education.

Consonants 
Payne (1981) describes the following consonant inventory for Axininca aka Ashéninka Apurucayali:
{| class="wikitable" style="text-align: center"
|-
! colspan="2" |
! Bilabial
! Apical
! Postalveolar/Palatal
! Velar
! Glottal
! Unspecified
|- style="font-size: x-small;"
|-
! rowspan="2" | Plosives
! style="font-size: x-small;"| aspirated
|  ||  || || || ||
|-
! style="font-size: x-small;"| unaspirated
|  ||  || ||  || ||
|-
! rowspan="2" | Affricates
! style="font-size: x-small;"| aspirated
| ||  ||  || ||  || 
|-
! style="font-size: x-small;"| unaspirated
| ||  ||  || || ||
|-
! colspan="2" | Fricatives
| ||  ||  || ||  ||
|-
! colspan="2" | Nasals
|  ||  ||  || || || 
|-
! colspan="2" | Liquids
| ||  ||  || || ||
|-
! colspan="2" | Glides
|  || ||  ||  || ||
|}
Judith Payne has the same inventory for the Pichis variety, but without /ç/, and she adds the palatalized consonants /pʲ/, /kʲ/, /hʲ/, /mʲ/ and /βʲ/.

Mihas shows a similar inventory for the Alto Perené variety with few differences. These are that Mihas does not include neither /tʰ/ nor /ç/; David Payne's contrast /t͡ʃ/-/t͡ʃʰ/ is considered /t͡ʃ/-/tʲ/ by Mihas, and she does not include any palatalized consonant because she considers them two-consonant clusters (Cj).

Payne and Mihas show a four-vowel system (/a/, /e/, /i/, /o/), while, in David Payne's Apurucayali, there are only three (/a/, /i/, /o/).

These three varieties are included in Pedrós' Northern Ashé-Ashá group.

References

Languages of Peru
Campa languages
Languages of Brazil
Arawakan languages